Shayn may refer to:

Shayn (crater), a crater on the Moon's far side
Shayn Solberg (born 1984), Canadian character actor in the 1997 film Air Bud

See also
Shajn, a surname
Shane (disambiguation)
Shayna, a given name
Shayne (disambiguation)